, real name Tanigawa Saichirō (谷川 佐市郎), was a Japanese film actor. He appeared in more than eighty films from 1923 to 1959.

Career
Kōdō first began acting on the stage in 1901 in shinpa dramas. He joined the Teikine studio in 1923, and after the war, the Toho Studio. He appeared in numerous films by Akira Kurosawa, most notably in Seven Samurai as the village elder.

Filmography

References

External links
 

1887 births
1960 deaths
People from Takasago, Hyōgo
Japanese male film actors